Unknown Session is an album by American pianist, composer and bandleader Duke Ellington recorded in 1960 but not released on the Columbia label until 1979.

Reception
The Allmusic review by Scott Yanow awarded the album 4 stars and stated "these renditions are quite enjoyable, swing hard and sound fresh. Ellington fans should pick this one up".

Track listing
:All compositions by Duke Ellington except as indicated
 "Everything But You" (Ellington, Don George, Harry James) - 3:32  
 "Black Beauty" - 3:16  
 "All Too Soon" (Ellington, Carl Sigman) - 3:12  
 "Something to Live For" (Ellington, Billy Strayhorn) - 2:45  
 "Mood Indigo" (Barney Bigard, Ellington, Irving Mills) - 3:48  
 "Creole Blues [Excerpt from Creole Rhapsody]" - 2:30  
 "Don't You Know I Care (Or Don't You Care to Know)" (Mack David, Ellington) - 2:57  
 "A Flower Is a Lovesome Thing" (Strayhorn) - 3:12  
 "Mighty Like the Blues" (Leonard Feather) - 3:19  
 "Tonight I Shall Sleep (With a Smile on My Face)" (Ellington, Irving Gordon) - 2:42  
 "Dual Highway" (Ellington, Johnny Hodges) - 2:52  
 "Blues" - 4:57
Recorded at Radio Recorders, Los Angeles on July 14, 1960

Personnel
Duke Ellington – piano 
Ray Nance - trumpet
Lawrence Brown - trombone
Johnny Hodges - alto saxophone
Paul Gonsalves - tenor saxophone
Harry Carney - baritone saxophone 
Aaron Bell - bass 
Sam Woodyard - drums

References

Columbia Records albums
Duke Ellington albums
1979 albums